Bishop's Stortford Hockey Club is a field hockey club in the town of Bishop's Stortford, Hertfordshire, England. The club plays in the East Region Hockey Association. The home ground is located at The Hertfordshire and Essex High School, where both the clubhouse and pitch are located.

The club has 800 active members and fields a total of fourteen senior sides, six men's and eight ladies' playing in the East Hockey Leagues. The Men's 1st XI play in the East Men's Division 1 South and the Ladies 1st XI play in the Vitality Women's Conference East.

Bishop’s Stortford Hockey Club has been reaccredited for another 3 years (2022-2025) as a ClubMark club (Sport England), making the club one of a select number across England to achieve the England Hockey ClubMark status.

History 
The club formed in 1948 and games were played at Cricket Field Lane, Hockerill Anglo-European College and Sawbridgeworth. The club barely raised a team in the early days, players relied on getting to away fixtures by train and taxi due to the lack of motorcars after World War II. In 1969 the club was elected to the Hertfordshire County League and the East Central League in 1972. Promotion to the East Region Hockey Association was gained in 1975.

The club had a number of successes over the years including County Champions in 1974, 1981 and 1986, East runners-up in 1982 and H.A. Cup quarter finalists in 1982 and 1986. Later successes include the integration of the Ladies Hockey Club and partnership in 1993 with Hockerill Anglo-European College.

In 2019 Bishop’s Stortford Hockey Club moved from Cricket Field Lane to The Hertfordshire and Essex High School, where a state of the art pitch and clubhouse overlooking the pitch with floor to ceiling windows and a balcony was built. The project has been a collaborative one, with funding coming from a variety of bodies and institutions including the Department for Education, Hertfordshire County Council, East Herts District Council, Sport England, Bishop's Stortford Judo Club, Bishop's Stortford Hockey Club as well as staff, students, parents, friends and families.

Senior Section 
The Ladies 1st XI had back to back promotions starting from 2019, where they become champions of both the East League Division 1 South and a year later champions in the East Premier Division. This saw the Ladies 1st XI for the first time in club history play in the Vitality Women's Conference East league.

Junior Section 
The clubs junior hockey caters for children from ages 5 to 18 and provides an opportunity to the local schools in the area, where hockey is not a mainstay of the PE or extra-curricular offer. The club also offers to other groups such as a new initiative in partnership with Grove Cottage to offer disability hockey.

Overall the club has developed a thriving junior section with over 500 members and runs hockey camps throughout the year, such as hockey training programmes with EVO Hockey.

The junior section recently linked up with investment services group Ravenscroft, who'll be known as the “Ravens”. The sponsorship will help provide several hockey programmes for children aged from 5 to 16 in the local community. The sponsorship of the Bishop’s Stortford Ravens aims to encourage young players to learn and develop their hockey and team skills through sessions organised in club and community environments, as well as local schools such as The Hertfordshire and Essex High School, Hockerill Anglo-European College, Northgate Primary, Windhill Primary and Fawbert & Barnard Infant’s Primary.

Olympic Legacy 
The 2012 London Olympic brought an increased visibility to Field hockey, where 630,000 people watched live hockey during the event, a pattern of continued growth in the sport has emerged and Bishop’s Stortford Hockey Club used this opportuning to attract new and returning players to their Vitality Back to Hockey programme in partnership with England Hockey.

Honours

Men's
East Premier B Champions 2006-07
East Premier A Runners-up 2002-03
East Premier A Runners-up 2000-01

Women's
East Premier Division Champions 2021-22
East League Division 1 South Champions 2019-20
East League Division 2 SW Champions 2016-17
East League Division 2 SW Champions 2009-10

Notable Players 
The club has a number of current and former international players still involved with coaching or playing at Bishop's Stortford Hockey Club. In addition a number of senior members still represent their country at Masters level.

Internationals

References

External links 
 Bishop's Stortford Hockey Club website
 England Hockey website
 East England Hockey 
 GMS Fixtures England Hockey
 Bishop's Stortford Town Council and Tourist Information 
 England Hockey Bishop's Stortford HC 
 Hockey Fixtures BSHC

English field hockey clubs
1948 establishments in England
Sport in Hertfordshire
Sports clubs established in 1948
Sports clubs
Bishop's Stortford
England Hockey League